, provisional designation , is a sub-kilometer asteroid, classified as near-Earth object and potentially hazardous asteroid of the Apollo group that had a small chance of impacting Earth in 2029.

It was discovered on 20 September 2006, by the Spacewatch project at the University of Arizona using the dedicated 0.9-meter telescope at Kitt Peak National Observatory.

Description 

 had a 1 in 42,000 chance of impacting Earth on 22 January 2029. By 29 October 2006, it was listed with a Torino Scale impact risk value of 0. It was removed from the Sentry Risk Table on 23 November 2006. It is now known that on 28 January 2029, the asteroid will be  from Earth.

It is a near-Earth asteroid that received minor attention in late September and early October 2006 because initial observations indicated a higher than usual probability that it would strike the Earth in 2029. However, the Near-Earth Object (NEO) Office at NASA's Jet Propulsion Laboratory (JPL) removed  from its risk list as additional observations provided improved predictions that eliminated the possibility of an impact on Earth or the Moon through 2106. Similarly, NEODyS estimates show a zero impact probability through 2080.

 briefly led the Earth-impact hazard list from 27 September 2006 through 4 October 2006, temporarily displacing (144898) 2004 VD17 from the number one position. At the time, both held a Torino scale of level 1 and were the only asteroids to hold a Torino value greater than 0.

It is also an Earth-crosser and Mars-crosser asteroid.

See also 
 List of exceptional asteroids
 Asteroid impact avoidance

References

External links 
 Asteroid Lightcurve Database (LCDB), query form (info )
 Asteroids and comets rotation curves, CdR Observatoire de Genève, Raoul Behrend
 
 
 

292220
292220
292220
292220
20060920